Inside Straight is a 1951 American Western film directed by Gerald Mayer and starring David Brian, Arlene Dahl, Barry Sullivan, Mercedes McCambridge and Paula Raymond.

Plot
In San Francisco in 1870, Ada Stritch owns a bank, but there is a run on it. She needs $3 million to keep it open. In desperation, she turns to Rip MacCool, a wealthy man whom she despises.

Also in need of Rip's help are newspaperman Johnny Sanderson and an old acquaintance, Flutey. They and Ada each have an issue with Rip from their past. Rip offers to deal a hand of poker, and if Ada wins, he will give her the $3 million. If not, he gets the bank.

Everyone recalls how they first met. Fifteen years before, Ada, a widow, had a small hotel that she wanted to sell. Rip and his pal Shocker were guests there. Rip wooed her romantically, then offered her $3,000 cash plus shares in the Mona Lisa gold mine. Ada accepted, only to learn later that the stock was worthless.

Johnny was a prizefighter. After a defeat, Rip helped him find a job. Rip was broke, but suddenly discovered that a vein of gold struck at the Mona Lisa mine has made his stock worth $250,000. Johnny loved a beautiful singer named Lily Douvane, but she married Rip for his money, leaving Johnny heartbroken. They had a baby boy and named him after Johnny. It was a loveless marriage, and when Lily caught Rip in a compromising position, she demanded a divorce, $1 million and custody of their child.

Johnny cared about the baby and for Zoe, the nanny. Rip interfered again, proposing to Zoe, then angering her, as well as losing his fortune. Zoe mortgaged their home, and she also was pregnant. Rip regained his money, thanks again to the Mona Lisa mine, but lost both Zoe and his new baby in childbirth.

Shocker explains to those present how Rip became the cold-hearted man whom he is. At 16, unable to pay for his own parents' funeral, he worked with Shocker in a mine. Money came to mean everything to him. After hearing this, Ada agrees to the winner-take-all offer. Rip gracefully loses, and the bank is saved, but all suspect that Rip, having a heart after all, held the winning hand.

Cast
 David Brian as Rip Maccool
 Arlene Dahl as Lily Douvane
 Barry Sullivan as Johnny Sanderson
 Mercedes McCambridge as Ada Stritch 
 Paula Raymond as Zoe Carnot 
 Claude Jarman Jr. Rip MacCool (Age 16)
 Lon Chaney, Jr. as Shocker (as Lon Chaney)
 Monica Lewis as Cafe Singer
 John Hoyt as Flutey Johnson
 Roland Winters as Alexander Tomson
 Barbara Billingsley as Miss Meadson
 Richard Hale as Undertaker
 Hayden Rorke as Carlson
 Jerry Hartleben as John Albert MacCool (Age 3)
 Dale Hartleben as John Albert MacCool (Age 8)
 Lou Nova as Connegan

Reception
The film was a financial failure. According to MGM records, the film earned $552,000 in the U.S. and Canada and $217,000 in other markets, causing a loss to the studio of $1,282,000.

See also
 List of American films of 1951

References

External links

1951 films
Metro-Goldwyn-Mayer films
1951 romantic drama films
American romantic drama films
1951 Western (genre) films
American Western (genre) films
Films scored by Lennie Hayton
American black-and-white films
1950s English-language films
1950s American films